Lambertiodes is a genus of moths belonging to the subfamily Tortricinae of the family Tortricidae.

Species
Lambertiodes harmonia (Meyrick, 1908)
Lambertiodes multipunctata Wang & Li, 2007

See also
List of Tortricidae genera

References

 , 1959, Ark. Zool. (2) 12: 166.
 , 2005, World Catalogue of Insects, 5

External links
tortricidae.com

Sparganothini
Tortricidae genera